Hugo Brandt Corstius (29 August 1935 – 28 February 2014) was a Dutch author, known for his achievements in both literature and science.

In 1970, he was awarded a PhD on the subject of computational linguistics. He was employed at the Mathematisch Centrum in Amsterdam. However, to the general public he is mostly known for his writing, in particular as a columnist for Vrij Nederland and de Volkskrant and as linguist and literary critic for Vrij Nederland, de Volkskrant, and NRC Handelsblad.

Pseudonyms
Hugo Brandt Corstius wrote under over sixty different pseudonyms, allonyms and aliases. He claimed each of them to be a component of his character.

In Vrij Nederland he used the pseudonym Piet Grijs and between 1979 and 1986 in de Volkskrant he used the pseudonym Stoker.   His other pseudonyms include Battus (in NRC Handelsblad and Vrij Nederland), Raoul Chapkis, Victor Baarn, Dolf Cohen, Maaike Helder, Peter Malenkov and Talisman.

The Battus name was reserved for writing on linguistics and language play, in columns, articles and books.  Many forms of word play (palindromes, the longest attested word in Dutch, e-less Dutch, etc. etc.) were bundled in the volume Opperlandse taal- & letterkunde, ("Upperlandic linguistics", where "Upperlandic" is word play on "Netherlandic"), and twenty years later a sequel Opperlans! (deliberate misspelling). Both books are concerned with the form of Dutch words with little regard to meaning. He also wrote De Encyclopedie, a book parodying encyclopedias, containing about 300 pages numbered 1 through 40000 or thereabouts, with many puns, references to non-existent pages and other jokes.

Prizes
 1966 - Anne Frank Prize for Ik sta op mijn hoofd
 1978 - Cestoda-prijs
 1978 - Burgemeester van Grunsven-prijs for his entire works
 1985 - Busken Huetprijs for Rekenen op taal
 1987 - P. C. Hooft Award for his entire works

Personal life
His daughter Aaf is a columnist, his daughter Merel is a Montessori teacher and graduate student in Boston, and his son Jelle is also an author, and was a correspondent in Russia.
Brandt Corstius died in Amsterdam after a long illness.

Bibliography
 1966 - De reizen van Pater Key (under pseudonym Raoul Chapkis)
 1966 - Zes dagen onbedachtzaamheid kan maken dat men eeuwig schreit (pseud. Raoul Chapkis)
 1966 - Ik sta op mijn hoofd (pseud. Raoul Chapkis)
 1970 - Exercises in Computational Linguistics (PhD thesis)
 1970 - Grijsboek, of de nagelaten bekentenissen van Raoul Chapkis
 1971 - Zinnig tuig
 1972 - Blijf met je fikken van de luizepoten af!
 1974 - Algebraïsche taalkunde
 1975 - A is een letter
 1975 - Piet Grijs is gek
 1978 - Computer-taalkunde
 1978 - Televisie, psychiaters, computers en andere griezelverhalen
 1978 - De encyclopedie (pseud. Battus)
 1981 - ...honderd. Ik kom!
 1981 - Opperlandse taal- & letterkunde
 1988 - Denk na
 1991 - Symmys (SYMMYƧ) (pseud. Battus)
 1995 - De hoofdredacteur
 1995 - Water en vuur
 1999 - Het bewustzijn

References

External links
 Hugo Brandt Corstius: briljant gelijkhebber, hartstochtelijk hater (Bio) - Volkskrant 

1935 births
2014 deaths
People from Eindhoven
20th-century Dutch scientists
Linguists from the Netherlands
Dutch computer scientists
Dutch journalists
P. C. Hooft Award winners
Academic staff of Tilburg University